Athens, GA: Inside/Out is a 1986 documentary film about the mid-1980s music scene in Athens, Georgia. The film has been described as "the definitive portrait of the city's world-renowned music scene."

About 
Athens, GA: Inside/Out was the creation of Tony Gayton, a first-time director who recently graduated from the University of Southern California. He was director, writer, and shot the documentary on the film. The film was produced by Bill Cody.

The film features interviews and concert footage of bands who were a part of the Athens music scene at the time, including well-known local legends R.E.M., Pylon, and The B-52's. Other featured bands are the Bar–B–Q Killers, Dreams So Real, Flat Duo Jets, Kilkenny Cats, Limbo District, Love Tractor, The Squalls, and Time Toy.

The documentary also features interviews with folk artists Howard Finster and Rev. John D. Ruth, whose wife plays the pump organ. Athens poet John Seawright reads his work "I Broke My Saw" in the film. Storyteller by ORT (William Orten Carlton) is featured as the film's narrator. Another local personality in the film is Walter Rittenberg, MB—master of barbecue and owner of Walter's BBQ.

Locations 
University of Georgia art professor James "Jim" Herbert, the film's cinematographer, says he selected the film's locations with director Gayton. Herbert says "I pushed for the most interesting visually. Some were appropriate as factual locations the bands played in."

R.E.M. was filmed performing "Swan Song H" and The Everly Brothers "Dream (All I Have to Do)" at the Lucy Cobb Institute chapel. R.E.M. were also filmed performing in the Morton Building at 195 West Washington Street in Athens. The Bar–B–Q Killers, Kilkenny Cats, and Time Toy were filmed performing at the Uptown Lounge on February 4, 1986. Flat Duo Jets were filmed playing on the porch on a fraternity house at the University of Georgia.

Mike Mills of R.E.M. and Mark Cline of Love Tractor were interviewed at Lay Park in Athens. The Bar–B–Q Killers and Walter Rittenberg were interviewed at Walter's Barbecue on 1660 West Broad Street in Athens. ORT was filmed at his former house at 274 Trilby Street in Athens.

Premiere 
Athens, GA: Inside/Out premiered at Buckhead Cinema and Drafthouse in Atlanta on November 30, 1986. This was an invitation-only showing for the participants in the film. MTV's The Cutting Edge showed the documentary the same night.

Athens, GA: Inside/Out had a limited theatrical run in 1987, mostly playing in major cities.

Reviews 
The New York Times called Athens, GA: Inside/Out a "bright, scrappy new documentary" that had "a refreshingly homemade feeling; it's as likably odd and unpretentious as Athens itself." The Washington Post wrote "Gayton's film reflects the energy and the self-made spirit of Athens," and also noted that, "Interviews and performances are skillfully interwoven."

Athens, GA: Inside/Out was named pick of the week video by People magazine in 1988. It was named one of the Top Ten Films about Georgia by the New Georgia Encyclopedia.

Impact and legacy 
Rolling Stone wrote "Athens, Ga." Inside/Out…helped bring the town’s music scene to national attention." James Herbert, the film's cinematographer, went on to direct 14 music videos for R.E.M., as well as videos for other Athens bands, including The B-52s.

The film was featured on the first six episodes of MTV's 120 Minutes, which held a contest "Win a Weekend in Athens, GA."

Athens, GA. Inside/Out: Original Soundtrack was released by I.R.S. Records on vinyl and cassette. A single from the soundtrack—The Squalls "Na Na Na Na" and Flat Duo Jets' "Crazy, Hazy Kisses"—reached number two on the college radio charts. The soundtrack was re-released in 2012. A 21st-century critic noted "The soundtrack to Athens, GA: Inside/Out is a testament to how much of an impact bands from a certain era can have on a particular scene."

On June 18, 2008, AthFest kicked off with a showing of Athens, GA: Inside/Out at Ciné, followed by a panel discussion and question and answer session with ORT, Vanessa Briscoe-Hay and Michael Lachowski of Pylon, Bob Hay of The Squalls, and other cast members. Dexter Romweber of Flat Duo Jets performed a solo set following the session.

In November 2021, the sequel Athens, Ga. Inside/Out 2: Red Turns Blue was released to streaming.

See also
 Music of Athens, Georgia

References

1987 films
American rock music films
Documentary films about rock music and musicians
Athens, Georgia
1980s English-language films
1980s American films